Liget is a village in Baranya county, Hungary. Liget had a population of 453 as of 2004. Liget coordinates: latitude is 46.2359700, and its longitude 18.1921000.

External links 
 Street map 
Things to do in Liget, Hungary

Populated places in Baranya County